Tissemsilt is the 38th province of Algeria with the capital being Tissemsilt. Théniet El Haâd National Park is located there.

History
The province was created from parts of Alger Province and Tiaret Province in 1984.

Administrative divisions
The province is divided into 8 districts (daïras), which are further divided into 22 communes or municipalities.

Districts

 Ammari
 Bordj Bou Naâma
 Bordj Emir Abdelkader
 Khémisti
 Lardjem
 Lazharia
 Théniet El Had
 Tissemsilt

Communes

 Ammari
 Beni Chaib
 Beni Lahcene
 Bordj Bou Naama
 Bordj El Emir Abdelkader
 Boucaid
 Khemisti
 Laayoune (Layoune)
 Larbaa
 Lardjem
 Lazharia
 Maacem
 Melaab
 Ouled Bessem
 Sidi Abed
 Sidi Boutouchent
 Sidi Lantri
 Sidi Slimane
 Tamalaht
 Théniet El Had
 Tissemsilt
 Youssoufia (El Youssoufia)

References

 
Provinces of Algeria
States and territories established in 1984